Roger White-Parsons (born 16 November 1960) is a former New Zealand rower.

At the 1982 World Rowing Championships at Rotsee, Switzerland, he won a gold medal with the New Zealand eight in seat five. At the 1983 World Rowing Championships at Wedau in Duisburg, Germany, he won a gold medal with the New Zealand eight in seat four.

In 1982, the 1982 rowing eight crew was named sportsman of the year. The 1982 team was inducted into the New Zealand Sports Hall of Fame in 1995.

References

1960 births
Living people
New Zealand male rowers
Rowers at the 1984 Summer Olympics
Olympic rowers of New Zealand
World Rowing Championships medalists for New Zealand